Council is an unincorporated community in Buchanan County, Virginia, United States.

Economy
Council Industrial Park is located in Council.  In 2021, textile manufacturer "Maine Five" announced it was opening a sewing factory at the industrial park, and planned to employ 100 workers by 2026.

Notable people
 Helen Timmons Henderson, elected to the Virginia state legislature.
 Ashley Stroehlein, sports reporter.

References

Unincorporated communities in Virginia
Unincorporated communities in Buchanan County, Virginia